APNG may mean:
APNG, image file format
APNG (cable system), submarine telecommunications cable system linking Australia and Papua New Guinea
APNG-2 (cable system), submarine telecommunications cable system linking Australia and Papua New Guinea
Airlines PNG, an airline of Papua New Guinea